Prince Allan Ray Eugenio Villanueva is a Filipino actor who is presently signed up for an exclusive contract with GMA Network. Prince used to be co-managed by German Moreno and GMA Artist Center until the time of the former's demise, which made him the last talent discovery of Kuya Germs.

Early life
Prince Villanueva is a Filipino actor, born in Manila, Philippines on August 21, 1998. He is the only son of Allan Villanueva and Lizelle Eugenio Villanueva, Mrs. Philippines - International 2009. He has an older sister, Precious and younger sister, Princess. He finished grade school and high school at Adamson University. At present, he is in second year college taking up B.S. Business Administration major in Marketing Management in the same university.

Career
Prince started very young in front of the camera, having won the title SM Star Baby 1998 when he was only six months old. The contest was a segment in Brunch, a morning show hosted by Bing Loyzaga and Michelle van Eimeren, aired on GMA Network. Growing up, he has been continuously getting the nods of many whenever he competes for a title in school pageants like being Star of the Night in his JS Prom, Mr. Intramurals, among others. His natural inclination for entertainment is a product of genetic endowment because both of his parents were models and actors in the past. Prince went to many casting calls for commercials and television shows, until he found his niche in GMA Network when he auditioned for Walang Tulugan with the Master Showman in August 2014.

Having only three months of television exposure in 2014, Prince was already nominated Best New Male TV Personality 2014 in the 28th PMPC Star Awards for Television, held at Solaire Resort and Casino, and was aired by ABS-CBN. Presently, Prince is an exclusive contract artist of GMA Network and is managed by GMA Artist Center. He was first seen on TV show Walang Tulugan with the Master Showman, where he displayed his singing, hosting, and dancing prowess, from 2014 until the show closes in 2016. The TV series InstaDad in 2014 introduced Prince as Ikot, his first character role as a GMA artist. After which, he was seen again on GMA's afternoon prime Wish I May (TV series) as Dave.
As of this writing, Prince is a mainstay of the top rating, primetime show Alyas Robin Hood as Rex.

Furthermore, he has also engaged into theater acting, as he is playing lead role in a stage play entitled Aquarium na Walang Tubig, under the direction of veteran actress and acting coach Ms. Anne Villegas of the Sining Pinagpala Theater Foundation.

Filmography

Television

Theatre

Awards and nominations

Endorsements
 Unisilver Time (HEA)
 Apple Peel Facial Care and Spa
 RMES Salon

References

External links
Prince Villanueva at GMANetwork.com

1998 births
Living people
Filipino male television actors
GMA Network personalities